South Carolina Highway 34 Connector may refer to:

South Carolina Highway 34 Connector (Darlington), a connector in Darlington
South Carolina Highway 34 Connector (Newberry), a connector in Newberry

034 Connector
034 Connector